Scholberg is a surname. Notable people with this name include:
Felix Scholberg, Canadian squash player, competitor in 2019 Canadian Junior Open Squash Championships
Henry Scholberg (1921–2012), librarian and scholar of India
Kate Scholberg, Canadian-American physicist
 (1925–1991), American scholar of Spanish literature